Travel Service may refer to a travel agency or:

Governmental Agencies
 United States Travel Service, a defunct part of the United States Department of Commerce

Specific travel agencies

 Canadian Universities Travel Service, a travel agency in Canada
 China Travel Service, the tourism and travel agency of the government of the People's Republic of China
 Cuba Travel Services, a tour and charter operator serving Cuba from the United States
 Dnata Travel Services, a travel agency in Dubai, United Arab Emirates
 Hong Thai Travel Services, a travel agency in Hong Kong, China

Airlines
Travel Service (airline), an airline headquartered in the Czech Republic
Travel Service (Hungary)
Travel Service (Slovakia)
Travel Service Polska

Bus operators

 Borehamwood Travel Services now London Sovereign, a bus operator in London, England
 Busways Travel Services, a former bus operator in the north east of England
 Durham Travel Services, a former bus operator in London, England
 Trathens Travel Services now Park's Motor Group, a bus operator in central Scotland